This is a list of every season played by Zimbru Chișinău in national football, from 1947 (the year the club was officially founded) to the most recently completed season.

Former names
Throughout history, the club has been known by various names.
 Dinamo – 1947—1949
 Burevestnik – 1950—1957
 Moldova – 1958—1965
 Avântul – 1966
 Moldova – 1967—1971
 Nistru – 1972—1990
 Zimbru – 1991—present

Key
 Soviet Union
1.Soviet Top League = Class A 1956–1962, Class A (First group) 1963–1964, Higher League 1974, 1983.
2.Soviet First League = Second group 1947–1949, Class B 1950–1955, Class A (Second group) 1965–1969,Class A (First group) 1970, First League 1971–1973, 1975–1982, 1984–1986, 1989–1991.
3.Soviet Second League = Second League 1987–1988.

 Moldova
1.Moldovan National Division = Superliga 1992, Liga Națională 1992–1996, Divizia Națională 1996–present.

League
Pos./T = Position/Teams
P = Games played
W = Games won
D = Games drawn
L = Games lost
GF = Goals for
GA = Goals against
Pts = Points
Cup Q = Qualifying round

Europe
PR = Preliminary round
PO = Play-off round
QR = Qualifying round
R1 = Round 1
R2 = Round 2

 Soviet Union

League and Cup history

{|class="wikitable"
|-bgcolor="#efefef"
! Season
! Level
! League(s)(name)
! Pos./T
! P
! W
! D
! L
! GF
! GA
! Pts
! Season
!Cup
|-
|align=center|1947
|align=center|2nd
|align=center|Second group, Ukrainian SSR zone
|align=center|13/(13)	 
|align=center|24  
|align=center|2   
|align=center|5   
|align=center|17 
|align=center|21  
|align=center|61   
|align=center|9
|align=center|1947
|align=center|Q
|-
|align=center|1948
|align=center|2nd
|align=center|Second group,Ukr. SSR zone,subgroup B
|align=center|7/(8)	 
|align=center|14 
|align=center|1 
|align=center|2  
|align=center|11
|align=center|11
|align=center|35
|align=center|4
|align=center|1948
|align=center|-
|-
|align=center|1949
|align=center|2nd
| align=left style="white-space:nowrap"|Second group, subgroup Union Republics
|align=center|11/(14)	 
|align=center|26
|align=center|7
|align=center|2  
|align=center|17
|align=center|36
|align=center|64
|align=center|16
|align=center|1949
|align=center|Q
|-
|align=center|1950
|align=center|2nd
|align=center|Class B
|align=center|6/(14)	 
|align=center|26
|align=center|11
|align=center|6
|align=center|9
|align=center|41
|align=center|41
|align=center|28
|align=center|1950
|align=center|1/8
|-
|align=center|1951
|align=center|2nd
|align=center|Class B
|align=center|10/(18) 
|align=center|34
|align=center|12
|align=center|10
|align=center|12
|align=center|47
|align=center|37
|align=center|34
|align=center|1951
|align=center|1/16
|-
|align=center|1952
|align=center|2nd
|align=center|Class B, subgroup Baku
|align=center|2/(5)
|align=center|4
|align=center|1
|align=center|2
|align=center|1
|align=center|4
|align=center|4
|align=center|4
|align=center|1952
|align=center|1/32
|-
|align=center|1952(2nd stage)
|align=center|2nd
|align=center|Class B, for 1-9 places
|align=center|8/(18)
|align=center|16
|align=center|6
|align=center|3
|align=center|7
|align=center|21
|align=center|27
|align=center|15
|align=center|1953
|align=center|1/32
|-
|align=center|1953
|align=center|2nd
|align=center|Class B, zone 2
|align=center|6/(10)
|align=center|17
|align=center|4
|align=center|8
|align=center|5
|align=center|14
|align=center|20
|align=center|16
|align=center|1954
|align=center|1/8
|-
|align=center|1953(2nd stage)
|align=center|2nd
|align=center|Class B, for 16-18 places
|align=center|16/(27)
|align=center|2
|align=center|1
|align=center|1
|align=center|0
|align=center|5
|align=center|2
|align=center|3
|align=center|1955
|align=center|Q
|-
|align=center|1954
|align=center|2nd
|align=center|Class B, zone 3
|align=center|12/(12)
|align=center|22
|align=center|2
|align=center|8
|align=center|12
|align=center|26
|align=center|40
|align=center|12
|align=center|1957
|align=center|1/16
|-
|align=center|1955
|align=center|2nd
|align=center|Class B, zone 1
|align=center bgcolor=lightgreen|1/(16)
|align=center|30
|align=center|20
|align=center|6
|align=center|4
|align=center|86
|align=center|46
|align=center|46
|align=center|1958
|align=center|1/8
|-
|align=center|1956
|align=center|1st
|align=center|Class A
|align=center|6/(12)
|align=center|22
|align=center|9
|align=center|5
|align=center|8
|align=center|38
|align=center|49
|align=center|23
|align=center|1959–60
|align=center|1/8
|-
|align=center|1957
|align=center|1st
|align=center|Class A
|align=center|9/(12)
|align=center|22
|align=center|4
|align=center|10
|align=center|8
|align=center|24
|align=center|36
|align=center|18
|align=center|1961
|align=center|1/32
|-
|align=center|1958
|align=center|1st
|align=center|Class A
|align=center|11/(12)
|align=center|22
|align=center|3
|align=center|9
|align=center|10
|align=center|25
|align=center|47
|align=center|15
|align=center|1962
|align=center|1/16
|-
|align=center|1959
|align=center|1st
|align=center|Class A
|align=center|10/(12)
|align=center|22
|align=center|6
|align=center|5
|align=center|11
|align=center|22
|align=center|45
|align=center|17
|align=center|1963
|align=center|1/4
|-
|align=center|1960
|align=center|1st
|align=center|Class A, group 1
|align=center|10/(11)
|align=center|20
|align=center|4
|align=center|5
|align=center|11
|align=center|18
|align=center|34
|align=center|13
|align=center|1964
|align=center|1/16
|-
|align=center|1960(2nd stage)
|align=center|1st
|align=center|Class A, for 19-22 places
|align=center|22/(22)
|align=center|6
|align=center|1
|align=center|3
|align=center|2
|align=center|10
|align=center|6
|align=center|5
|align=center|1965
|align=center|1/32
|-
|align=center|1961
|align=center|1st
|align=center|Class A, group B
|align=center|9/(11)
|align=center|20
|align=center|6
|align=center|4
|align=center|10
|align=center|30
|align=center|36
|align=center|16
|align=center|1965–66
|align=center|1/16
|-
|align=center|1961(2nd stage)
|align=center|1st
|align=center|Class A, for 11-22 places
|align=center|16/(22)
|align=center|12
|align=center|6
|align=center|2
|align=center|4
|align=center|16
|align=center|18
|align=center|14
|align=center|1966–67
|align=center|1/32
|-
|align=center|1962
|align=center|1st
|align=center|Class A, group A
|align=center|5/(11)
|align=center|20
|align=center|8
|align=center|5
|align=center|7
|align=center|27
|align=center|25
|align=center|21
|align=center|1967–68
|align=center|1/16
|-
|align=center|1962(2nd stage)
|align=center|1st
|align=center|Class A, for 1-12 places
|align=center|12/(22)
|align=center|12
|align=center|1
|align=center|2
|align=center|9
|align=center|9
|align=center|19
|align=center|4
|align=center|1969
|align=center|Q
|-
|align=center|1963
|align=center|1st
|align=center|Class A (First group)
|align=center|13/(20)
|align=center|38
|align=center|8
|align=center|16
|align=center|14
|align=center|27
|align=center|43
|align=center|32
|align=center|1970
|align=center|1/64
|-
|align=center|1964
|align=center|1st
|align=center|Class A (First group)
|align=center bgcolor=red|17/(17)
|align=center|32
|align=center|6
|align=center|6
|align=center|20
|align=center|15
|align=center|44
|align=center|18
|align=center|1971
|align=center|1/16
|-
|align=center|1965
|align=center|2nd
|align=center|Class A (Second group), subgroup 1
|align=center|5/(16)
|align=center|30
|align=center|12
|align=center|8
|align=center|10
|align=center|20
|align=center|18
|align=center|32
|align=center|1972
|align=center|1/32
|-
|align=center|1965(2nd stage)
|align=center|2nd
|align=center|Class A (Second group), for 1-16 places
|align=center|14/(32)
|align=center|16
|align=center|4
|align=center|4
|align=center|8
|align=center|11
|align=center|19
|align=center|12
|align=center|1973
|align=center|1/16
|-
|align=center|1966
|align=center|2nd
|align=center|Class A (Second group), subgroup 2
|align=center|13/(18)
|align=center|34
|align=center|8
|align=center|15
|align=center|11
|align=center|23
|align=center|29
|align=center|31
|align=center|1974
|align=center|1/16
|-
|align=center|1967
|align=center|2nd
|align=center|Class A (Second group), subgroup 2
|align=center|5/(20)
|align=center|38
|align=center|15
|align=center|15
|align=center|8
|align=center|30
|align=center|19
|align=center|45
|align=center|1975
|align=center|1/16
|-
|align=center|1968
|align=center|2nd
|align=center|Class A (Second group), subgroup 1
|align=center|9/(21)
|align=center|40
|align=center|16
|align=center|12
|align=center|12
|align=center|40
|align=center|36
|align=center|44
|align=center|1976
|align=center|1/16
|-
|align=center|1969
|align=center|2nd
|align=center|Class A (Second group), subgroup 4
|align=center|6/(21)
|align=center|40
|align=center|14
|align=center|16
|align=center|10
|align=center|36
|align=center|23
|align=center|44
|align=center|1977
|align=center|1/16
|-
|align=center|1970
|align=center|2nd
|align=center|Class A (First group)
|align=center|11/(22)
|align=center|42
|align=center|13
|align=center|15
|align=center|14
|align=center|40
|align=center|34
|align=center|41
|align=center|1978
|align=center|1/16
|-
|align=center|1971
|align=center|2nd
|align=center|First League
|align=center|17/(22)
|align=center|42
|align=center|12
|align=center|14
|align=center|16
|align=center|35
|align=center|42
|align=center|38
|align=center|1979
|align=center|Q
|-
|align=center|1972
|align=center|2nd
|align=center|First League
|align=center|12/(20)
|align=center|38
|align=center|11
|align=center|12
|align=center|15
|align=center|39
|align=center|49
|align=center|34
|align=center|1980
|align=center|1/8
|-
|align=center|1973
|align=center|2nd
|align=center|First League
|align=center bgcolor=lightgreen|2/(20)
|align=center|38
|align=center|25
|align=center|7
|align=center|6
|align=center|71
|align=center|35
|align=center|52
|align=center|1981
|align=center|Q
|-
|align=center|1974
|align=center|1st
|align=center|Higher League
|align=center bgcolor=red|16/(16)
|align=center|30
|align=center|4
|align=center|8
|align=center|18
|align=center|32
|align=center|59
|align=center|16
|align=center|1982
|align=center|Q
|-
|align=center|1975
|align=center|2nd
|align=center|First League
|align=center|6/(20)
|align=center|38
|align=center|17
|align=center|9
|align=center|12
|align=center|44
|align=center|43
|align=center|43
|align=center|1983
|align=center|1/16
|-
|align=center|1976
|align=center|2nd
|align=center|First League
|align=center|5/(20)
|align=center|38
|align=center|15
|align=center|14
|align=center|9
|align=center|51
|align=center|40
|align=center|44
|align=center|1984
|align=center|1/16
|-
|align=center|1977
|align=center|2nd
|align=center|First League
|align=center|11/(20)
|align=center|38
|align=center|11
|align=center|14
|align=center|13
|align=center|45
|align=center|51
|align=center|36
|align=center|1984–85
|align=center|1/16
|-
|align=center|1978
|align=center|2nd
|align=center|First League
|align=center|10/(20)
|align=center|38
|align=center|13
|align=center|11
|align=center|14
|align=center|42
|align=center|40
|align=center|37
|align=center|1985–86
|align=center|1/32
|-
|align=center|1979
|align=center|2nd
|align=center|First League
|align=center|8/(24)
|align=center|46
|align=center|18
|align=center|14
|align=center|14
|align=center|53
|align=center|51
|align=center|48
|align=center|1986–87
|align=center|1/32
|-
|align=center|1980
|align=center|2nd
|align=center|First League
|align=center|8/(24)
|align=center|46
|align=center|20
|align=center|8
|align=center|18
|align=center|60
|align=center|55
|align=center|48
|align=center|1987–88
|align=center|1/64
|-
|align=center|1981
|align=center|2nd
|align=center|First League
|align=center|8/(24)
|align=center|46
|align=center|17
|align=center|12
|align=center|17
|align=center|54
|align=center|51
|align=center|46
|align=center|1988–89
|align=center|1/16
|-
|align=center|1982
|align=center|2nd
|align=center|First League
|align=center bgcolor=lightgreen|2/(22)
|align=center|42
|align=center|23
|align=center|10
|align=center|9
|align=center|67
|align=center|38
|align=center|56
|align=center|1989–90
|align=center|1/64
|-
|align=center|1982Final
|align=center|2nd
|align=center|First League, Final for 1-2 places
|align=center|2/(22)
|align=center|1
|align=center|0
|align=center|0
|align=center|1
|align=center|0
|align=center|1
|align=center|0
|align=center|1990–91
|align=center|1/64
|-
|align=center|1983
|align=center|1st
|align=center|Higher League
|align=center bgcolor=red|18/(18)
|align=center|34
|align=center|3
|align=center|4
|align=center|27
|align=center|19
|align=center|73
|align=center|10
|align=center|1991–92
|align=center|1/64
|-
|align=center|1984
|align=center|2nd
|align=center|First League
|align=center|18/(22)
|align=center|42
|align=center|13
|align=center|12
|align=center|17
|align=center|45
|align=center|58
|align=center|38
|-
|align=center|1985
|align=center|2nd
|align=center|First League, West zone
|align=center|11/(11)
|align=center|20
|align=center|5
|align=center|3
|align=center|12
|align=center|16
|align=center|35
|align=center|13
|-
|align=center|1985(2nd stage)
|align=center|2nd
|align=center|First League, group B for 13-22 places
|align=center|19/(22)
|align=center|18
|align=center|7
|align=center|5
|align=center|6
|align=center|22
|align=center|19
|align=center|19
|-
|align=center|1986
|align=center|2nd
|align=center|First League
|align=center bgcolor=red|24/(24)
|align=center|46
|align=center|6
|align=center|9
|align=center|31
|align=center|31
|align=center|101
|align=center|21
|-
|align=center|1987
|align=center|3rd
|align=center|Second League, zone 5
|align=center|1/(18)
|align=center|34
|align=center|22
|align=center|8
|align=center|4
|align=center|52
|align=center|17
|align=center|52
|-
|align=center|1987(Final)
|align=center|3rd
|align=center|Second League, Final C for 1-3 places
|align=center|2/(3)
|align=center|4
|align=center|2
|align=center|0
|align=center|2
|align=center|5
|align=center|3
|align=center|4
|-
|align=center|1988
|align=center|3rd
|align=center|Second League, zone 5
|align=center|1/(18)
|align=center|34
|align=center|21
|align=center|11
|align=center|2
|align=center|84
|align=center|34
|align=center|53
|-
|align=center|1988(Final)
|align=center|3rd
|align=center|Second League, Final A for 1-3 places
|align=center bgcolor=lightgreen|1/(3)
|align=center|4
|align=center|3
|align=center|1
|align=center|0
|align=center|7
|align=center|3
|align=center|7
|-
|align=center|1989
|align=center|2nd
|align=center|First League
|align=center|10/(22)
|align=center|42
|align=center|19
|align=center|5
|align=center|18
|align=center|45
|align=center|59
|align=center|43
|-
|align=center|1990
|align=center|2nd
|align=center|First League
|align=center|7/(20)
|align=center|38
|align=center|14
|align=center|12
|align=center|12
|align=center|50
|align=center|44
|align=center|40
|-
|align=center|1991
|align=center|2nd
|align=center|First League
|align=center|19/(22)
|align=center|42
|align=center|11
|align=center|13
|align=center|18
|align=center|36
|align=center|49
|align=center|35
|}
Notes: 2 points for a win, 1 point for a draw, 0 points for a loss.

 In the table above, in the 2nd stage of the seasons 1961, 1962, 1965, 1985, only the number of games played by Zimbru in this part of the league are shown. 
 In the seasons 1961 and 1985, all the results of the 1st stage are taken into account in the final table.
 In the season 1962, only the results with teams that finished in the top 6 (1st stage) have been taken into account for the 2nd stage.
 In the season 1965, only the results with teams that finished in the top 8 (1st stage) have been taken into account for the 2nd stage.
 The complete table for these four seasons are shown below.

{|class="wikitable"
|-bgcolor="#efefef"
! Season
! Level
! League(s)(name)
! Pos./T
! P
! W
! D
! L
! GF
! GA
! Pts
|-
|align=center|1961
|align=center|1st
|align=center|Class A
|align=center|16/(22)
|align=center|32
|align=center|12
|align=center|6
|align=center|14
|align=center|46
|align=center|54
|align=center|30
|-
|align=center|1962
|align=center|1st
|align=center|Class A
|align=center|12/(22)
|align=center|22
|align=center|3
|align=center|5
|align=center|14
|align=center|20
|align=center|35
|align=center|11
|-
|align=center|1965
|align=center|2nd
|align=center|Class A (Second group)
|align=center|14/(32)
|align=center|30
|align=center|7
|align=center|9
|align=center|14
|align=center|16
|align=center|29
|align=center|23
|-
|align=center|1985
|align=center|2nd
|align=center|First League
|align=center|19/(22)
|align=center|38
|align=center|12
|align=center|8
|align=center|18
|align=center|38
|align=center|54
|align=center|32
|}

 In 1973, a new rule was introduced that lasted only one season. According to the new regulation, in the case of draw, the winner of the match had to be decided by a penalty shoot-out. The winner of the penalty shoot-out received 1 point (instead of 2 for a win in 90 minutes). The loser received no points. In the 1973 season, seven games were decided on penalties. Zimbru won twice and lost five times. The total number of points in the season was 52 (50 points earned for 25 wins in the regular time, and 2 points after penalty shoot-outs).
 In the overall season statistics, these seven games are counted as draws.
 In 1978, a draw limit rule was introduced. This restriction was abolished at the end of 1988 season. The only time Zimbru was affected by this rule was in the 1979 season. The limit for points awarded for draws earned was 12. For 2 draws that exceeded the limit, Zimbru earn no points.

Soviet playoff
 Three times, Zimbru defended their right to play in the Soviet First League (Class B in those years) by taking part in the playoff matches. The regulation that was introduced in 1950 and abolished in 1957 stated that the team that became the champion of the Moldavian SSR would play in play-off games against the other team from Moldavian SSR which already played in Class A or B, and took the lowest place in the league. However, in the early 1950s, Zimbru was the only team that represented Moldavian SSR in the Soviet League, so the final place in the Class B table did not matter for the playoffs. These play-off matches were not always held; they were played only at the discretion of the Moldavian SSR national committee. The playoff rule was active for eight seasons, but was applied only three times. The results of the Burevestnik team (now called Zimbru) are shown below.
 1950 Burevestnik – Krasnoe Znamya (Chișinău) – 7–2, 3–1.
 1951 Burevestnik – Krasnaya Zvezda (Tiraspol) – 8–0, 3–2.
 1954 Burevestnik – Institutul Agricol (Chișinău) – 1–2, 3–0, – (the opponent refused to play the decisive match).
 In the overall season statistics the playoff matches are not counted.

Overall season statistics in the Soviet Union

 Moldova

League history

Notes: 2 points for a win, 1 point for a draw, 0 points for a loss.
Starting with the 1994–95 season: 3 points for a win, 1 point for a draw, 0 points for a loss.
 Players in bold were Top league scorers that season.
 In the 1992 season, both Tiligul Tiraspol and Zimbru finished the league with an equal number of points (35). The Moldovan Football Federation decided that an additional match would be played at a neutral venue, in the city of Bălți, on June 28. However, Tiligul refused to participate in the match, so Zimbru were crowned champions of Moldova. In the overall season table, this match is included as a technical win.

Overall seasons table in Divizia Națională

Honours

Moldova
 Divizia Națională / Liga Națională / Superliga 
 Champion (8): 1992, 1992–93, 1993–94, 1994–95, 1995–96, 1997–98, 1998–99, 1999–00

 Runner-up (5): 1996–97, 2000–01, 2002–03, 2005–06, 2006–07

 Third place (4): 2001–02, 2003–04, 2011–12, 2015–16

 Cupa Moldovei 
Winner (6): 1996–97, 1997–98, 2002–03, 2003–04, 2006–07, 2013–14
Runner-up (3): 1994–95, 1999–00, 2017–18

 Supercupa Moldovei
Winner (1): 2014
Runner-up (3): 2003, 2004, 2007

Soviet Union
 Soviet First League
Winner (1): 1955.
Runner-up (2): 1973, 1982.

 Soviet Second League
Winner (2): 1987, 1988.

Records

Soviet Union
 Most overall league appearances: Gheorghe Tegleațov (453)
 Most overall league goals: Ihor Nadein (80)

Soviet Top League 
Most league appearances: Vladimir Țincler (182)
Most league goals: Yuri Korotkov (27)
Most league goals in one season: Dmitri Dubrovski –13 (1961 season)
Biggest league win: Moldova – Kalev Tallinn 6–0 (1960)
Biggest league defeat: Spartak Moscow – Burevestnik 9–2 (1956), Lokomotiv Moscow – Moldova 8–1 (1958)CSK MO Moscow – Moldova 7–0 (1959)

Soviet First League 
Most league appearances: Gheorghe Tegleațov (396)
Most league goals: Ihor Nadein (77)
Most league goals in one season: Yuri Korotkov – 31 (1955 season)
Biggest league win: Burevestnik – Dinamo Tallinn 7–0 (1955)
Biggest league defeat: Rostselmash Rostov-on-Don – Nistru 7–0 (1986)

Soviet Second League 
Most league appearances: Anatoli Chistov , Sergiu Sîrbu (75)
Most league goals: Nikolai Vasilyev (44)
Most league goals in one season: Nikolai Vasilyev – 30 (1988 season)
Biggest league win: Nistru – Gomselmash Gomel 5–0 (1988)
Biggest league defeat: Vityaz Vitebsk – Nistru 2–0 (1987), Kuban Krasnodar – Nistru 2–0 (1987)Dnepr Mogilev – Nistru 2–0 (1988), Khimik Grodno – Nistru 4–2 (1988)

Soviet Cup 
Biggest cup win: Burevestnik – Institutul Agricol (Chișinău) 8–0 (1955)
Biggest cup defeat: Spartak Moscow – Burevestnik 7–0 (1950)

Moldova
Divizia Națională 
Most league appearances: Iurie Miterev (248)
Most league goals: Iurie Miterev (129)
Most league goals in one season: Vladislav Gavriliuc (1995–96 season) and Iurie Miterev (1996–97 season) – 34
Biggest league win: Ciuhur Ocnița – Zimbru 1–15 (19 June 1997)
Biggest league defeat: Sheriff Tiraspol – Zimbru 6–0 (6 November 2021)
Most straight wins: 12 games (started in 1993–94 season, ended in 1994–95 season)
Most games without loss: 29 (started in 1998–99 season, ended in 1999–2000 season)
Most consecutive matches scored in by player: 10 games (1995–96) – Vladislav Gavriliuc
Longest consecutive run without conceding a goal: 12 games (1153 minutes) – Denis Romanenco, 1998–99 season

Cupa Moldovei 
Biggest cup win: Zimbru – Vierul Sîngerei 16–0 (1995)
Biggest cup defeat: Zimbru – Milsami Orhei 0–3 (13 April 2022)

Statistics
Statistics are correct as of 1 January 2019.

Most league appearances

 Soviet Union 

 Moldova

Most league goals

 Soviet Union 

 Moldova

All-time top scorers

References

External links
All Soviet seasons at wildstat.com
All Divizia Națională seasons at wildstat.com
All seasons at footballfacts.ru 
Soviet seasons at footbook.ru 
Divizia Națională seasons at fmf.md 

Seasons
 
Moldovan football club seasons